The North Carolina General Assembly of 1781 met in Wake Court House (also known as Bloomsbury) from June 23 to July 14, 1781. Each of the 50 North Carolina counties were allowed one Senator and two members of the House of Commons; 6 districts/boroughs towns also elected one House member each.

Leadership
 Speaker of the House: Thomas Benbury (Chowan County)
 Clerk of the House: John Hunt (unknown county)
 Speaker of the North Carolina Senate: Alexander Martin Guilford County
 Cleark of the Senate: John Haywood (Edgecombe County)

The governor of North Carolina during the time of this session of the legislature was Thomas Burke, who was elected by the General Assembly in June of 1781. James Glasgow served as Secretary of State and James Iredell served as Attorney General.

Councilors of State

The North Carolina Constitution of 1776 required "that the Senate and House of Commons, jointly, at their first meeting after each annual election, shall by ballot elect seven persons to be a Council of State for one year, who shall advise the Governor in the execution of his office."

The known North Carolina Council of State members elected by the General Assembly in 1781 included:
 June 26, 1781 John Penn, Granville County 
 June 26, 1781 Spruce Macay, Rowan County 
 June 26, 1781 Willie Jones, Halifax County
 June 26, 1781 Benjamin Seawell, Franklin County
 June 26, 1781 Philemon Hawkins, Jr., Granville County (declined to serve)
 June 26, 1781 John Butler, Orange County
 June 26, 1781 Edward Jones, Warren County
 July 11, 1781 Whitmel Hill, Martin County

Members

Notes:

References

1781
General Assembly
 1781
 1781